The following list of people have served as president of Luther College, a private liberal arts college located in Decorah, Iowa. The current president is Dr. Jenifer K. Ward.

References

Luther College presidents
Luther College